Francis Perry Elliott (July 29, 1861 – 1924) was a writer and educator. Some of his works were adapted to film. His novel Pals First was staged and adapted into two films. Frederick Townsend Martin illustrated his book The Haunted Pajamas.

Early life 
Elliott was born on July 29, 1861, in Nashville, Tennessee. His parents were William F. and Mary E. Elliott.

Elliott attended Montgomery Bell Academy and Vanderbilt University.

Career 
From 1883 to 1890, Elliot worked at schools in Tennessee and Mississippi, either as a teacher or superintendent. In Jackson, Tennessee, Elliot was head of a high school.

Elliot worked as a professor of English literature at Belmont University for six years.

From 1896 to 1898, Elliot was headmaster of a school in Tarrytown, New York.

From 1898 to 1900, Elliot was associated with the publisher Harper Brothers.

Elliot edited magazines including Home, The New Age, and The Great Southwest.

Personal life 
Elliott married Winifred McKenzie Payne of Keokuk, Iowa on September 22, 1897.

Bibliography
The Gift of Abou Hassan (1912)
Pals First; A Tale of Love and Comradery
The Haunted Pajamas
The Shadow Girl

Filmography 
The Square Deceiver (1917)
The Haunted Pajamas (1917)
The Square Deceiver (1917)
Pals First (1918)
Lend Me Your Name (1918)
Pals First (1926)

References

American writers
American educators
1861 births
1924 deaths
Vanderbilt University alumni
Belmont University faculty